Darlene Koldenhoven (born October 9, 1950) is an American musician. Darlene won a Grammy Award for her singing.

Career
Grammy recipient and is a three-time Grammy nominee for the lead soprano in Clare Fischer's 2+2.

She was the featured soprano soloist in the PBS television special, Yanni, Live at the Acropolis, and in Grammy Winner Ricky Kej's "Shanti Samsara" concerts/videos in Bangalore, India, for consciousness awareness.

Darlene has an MVP award from the Los Angeles Chapter of the National Academy of Recording Arts and Sciences (the Grammys) for "Best Studio Singer" for singing in venues including movies, television, albums/CDs, commercials, video games, live shows.

She has a Platinum album for her vocal work on Pink Floyd's "A Momentary Lapse of Reason". She earned a Gold album as the tambourine-waving choir nun in both Sister Act films with Whoopi Goldberg and off-camera as the production vocal coach, vocal contractor, and music director. She has two Telley Awards for her song/video, "Love is an Action Word". Her albums have debuted or gone to #1 on the ZMR Radio Charts and have been voted by Broadcasters worldwide Best Vocal Album 2007 Infinite Voice, Best Holiday Album 2007 Heavenly Peace, a Nomination for Best Vocal Album 2011 Solitary Treasures and a Nomination for Best Piano Album with Instrumentation 2014 Tranquil Times.

Author and educator
In 2007 Darlene Koldenhoven released a music education book with instructional CDs called Tune Your Voice: Singing and Your Mind's Musical Ear. As a member of the Society of Composers and Lyricists, she presented seminars on voice and composing for voice, as well as seminars for the Nebraska Music Educators Association and National Association of Teachers of Singing (NATS). She served on the NARAS Board of Trustees for two terms, was a Los Angeles Chapter Second Vice President for one term, and Governor for six years.

Discography 
 Chromatones (2018)
 Color Me Home (2017)
 Tranquil Times (2013)
 Solitary Treasures (2011)
 Inspired by a True Story (2011)
 Infinite Voice (2007)
 Heavenly Peace (2000)
 Free to Serve (1996)
 Keys to the World (1996)

Awards

References

External links
 
 
 

1950 births
21st-century American women
American sopranos
American vocal coaches
American women singers
American writers about music
Grammy Award winners
Living people